Noel Gallagher (born 1939) is an Irish retired hurler. Playing at both midfield and half-forward positions, he was a member of the Cork senior team from 1959 until 1965.
 
Gallagher first played inter-county hurling as a dual player with the Cork minor teams in 1956 and 1957. He subsequently joined the Cork junior hurling team, winning an All-Ireland medal in 1958. Gallagher was later added to the Cork senior team, making his debut during the 1959 championship. He was a regular member of the team over the following six season, and his senior career ended after the 1965 championship. Four years later, Gallagher was a late addition to the Cork intermediate team. He ended the season as an All-Ireland runner-up.

Honours

University College Cork
Cork Senior Hurling Championship: 1963
Fitzgibbon Cup (1): 1959

University College Dublin
Dublin Senior Hurling Championship: 1961

Youghal
Cork Intermediate Hurling Championship: 1955, 1969

Bandon
West Cork Junior A Hurling Championship: 1977

Cork
All-Ireland Junior Hurling Championship: 1958
Munster Junior Hurling Championship: 1958

References

1939 births
Living people
UCC hurlers
UCD hurlers
Youghal hurlers
Bandon hurlers
Imokilly hurlers
Cork inter-county hurlers
Munster inter-provincial hurlers
Hurling forwards
Dual players